Dejoie Sylvain Ifashabayo (born 30 April 1994) is a Rwandan social entrepreneur and humanitarian. He founded Hope initiative in 2016. He is the director of operations at Anidaso

Early life
Dejoie was born in southern part of Rwanda, Kamonyi and grew up in Kigali. In 2015, he moved to Ghana to pursue higher education at Ashesi University as a MasterCard scholar.

Education
Dejoie studied at Lycée de Kigali during his highschool years.  He is currently at Ashesi University offering Business Administration and leadership

Awards and recognition
He has received a number of awards such as the MasterCard scholarship award. He is currently a Dalai Lama fellow. He also has awards within Ashesi University such as, he won the most enterprise pitch.

References

1994 births
Rwandan activists
Ashesi University alumni
Living people